
Umbrella Man may refer to:

 Umbrella man (JFK assassination), Louie Steven Witt, a witness to the JFK assassination who was seen carrying an umbrella
 Neville Chamberlain, Prime Minister of the United Kingdom from 1937 to 1940, nicknamed "Umbrella Man" because he often carried an umbrella in public and was invariably depicted with it in cartoons - sometimes even drawn as an umbrella
 Antonio Luis Hernandez, a Puerto Rican gang member in New York City who was a cohort of Salvador Agron, the Capeman
 Robert W. Patten, an eccentric figure in Seattle's history and the cartoon figure modeled after him
 The widely reposted image of an unnamed protester, who during the 2014 Hong Kong protests, used two umbrellas to protect himself from tear gas
 Umbrella man (Minneapolis riots), an unnamed protester who was captured on video engaging in property destruction on May 27, 2020, during the George Floyd protests in Minneapolis–Saint Paul

Arts, media, and entertainment

Literature
 "The Umbrella Man", a Roald Dahl short story collected in The Umbrella Man and Other Stories
 Will Scott story The Umbrella Man, filmed in 1937 as London by Night (1937)

Music
 "The Umbrella Man" (song), a song by Flanagan and Allen
 "Umbrella Man", a song by the Partridge Family
 "Adios Hermanos", a song by Paul Simon

Sculpture
 Allow Me (Portland, Oregon), a bronze sculpture by John Seward Johnson II

Film
 THE UMBRELLA MAN (2019), a short film by Alex Bale